Pedro Mota Soares (born 29 May 1974) is a Portuguese politician. He was the Portuguese Solidarity, Employment and Social Security Minister from 2011 to 2015 under Prime Minister Pedro Passos Coelho.

Attorney Consultant at Andersen TaxLegal Portugal.
Member of Parliament, chairperson of the municipal assembly of Cascais.

Run the Rotterdam and the Lisbon Marathon in 2018.

References

Government ministers of Portugal
Living people
21st-century Portuguese lawyers
1974 births
People from Lisbon